Julianatop is the highest mountain in Suriname at . It is located in the Sipaliwini District. The mountain is named after Juliana of the Netherlands. The Amerindian name of the mountain is Ipinumin.

The mountain was supposedly climbed by the Amerindian John Tawjoeram during the 1963 Schultz expedition, however there was no trace of John. On 16 September 2006, an expedition set out to climb the mountain and planted the Surinamese flag on the top.

References

External links
 Julianatop at Peakbagger
 View of Julianatop from this website.  (english translation)

Inselbergs of South America
Mountains of Suriname
Highest points of countries